The 2013 Open GDF Suez Seine-et-Marne was a professional tennis tournament played on indoor hard courts. It was the first edition of the tournament which was part of the 2013 ITF Women's Circuit, offering a total of $50,000 in prize money. It took place in Croissy-Beaubourg, France, on 25–31 March 2013.

Singles main draw entrants

Seeds 

 1 Rankings are as of 18 March 2013

Other entrants 
The following players received wildcards into the singles main draw:
  Manon Arcangioli
  Séverine Beltrame
  Clothilde de Bernardi
  Amandine Hesse

The following players received entry from the qualifying draw:
  Cristina Dinu
  Giulia Gatto-Monticone
  Lesley Kerkhove
  Diāna Marcinkēviča

The following player received entry by a Junior Exempt:
  Antonia Lottner

Champions

Singles 

  Anne Keothavong def.  Sandra Záhlavová 7–6(7–3), 6–3

Doubles 

  Anna-Lena Friedsam /  Alison Van Uytvanck def.  Stéphanie Foretz Gacon /  Eva Hrdinová 6–3, 6–4

External links 
 2013 Open GDF Suez Seine-et-Marne at ITFtennis.com
 

2013 ITF Women's Circuit
Open de Seine-et-Marne
2013 in French tennis